Qoşman is a rural locality (a selo) in Qaybıç District, Tatarstan. The population was 765 as of 2010.

Geography 
 is located 5 km to the east of Olı Qaybıç, district's administrative centre, and 104 km southwest of Qazan, republic's capital, by road.

History 
The village of Qoşman was created by merging two villages, Olı Qoşman and Keçe Qoşman. Both of them existed already during the period of the Khanate of Qazan.

From 17th to first half of the 19th centuries both villages' residents belonged to the social estate of state peasants.

Before the creation of Tatar ASSR in 1920 both villages were a part of Zöyä Uyezd of Qazan Governorate. Since 1920 was a part of Zöyä Canton; after the creation of districts in Tatar ASSR (Tatarstan) in Ölcän (later Qaybıç) (1927–1963), Bua (1963–1965), Apas (1965–1991) and Qaybıç districts.

Notable people 

References

External links 
 

Rural localities in Kaybitsky District